Álvaro Blancarte Osuna (March 27, 1937 – August 22, 2021) was a Mexican painter, sculptor, and muralist.

References

1937 births
2021 deaths
Mexican painters
People from Culiacán
People from Tecate
Artists from Sinaloa
Artists from Baja California